Guitar Slinger is an album by guitarist and singer Johnny Winter.  Released in 1984, it was his first studio album in four years, and his first album for Alligator Records. It was the second consecutive album to feature no original Winter compositions.

Guitar Slinger was nominated for a Grammy Award for Best Traditional Blues Album.

Track listing
"It's My Life, Baby" (Don Robey) – 4:08
"Don't Take Advantage of Me" (Lee Baker, Jr.) – 5:22
"Iodine in My Coffee" (Muddy Waters) – 3:44
"Trick Bag" (Earl King) – 3:20
"Mad Dog" (Charles Sheffield, Eddie Shuler) – 4:27
"Boot Hill" – 3:35
"I Smell Trouble" (Don Robey) – 4:50
"Lights Out" (Mac Rebennack, Seth David) – 2:33
"Kiss Tomorrow Goodbye" (Al Reed) – 3:53
"My Soul" (Jamesetta Hawkins) – 3:45

Personnel
Musicians
Johnny Winter – guitar, vocals
Ken Saydak – keyboards
Johnny B. Gayden – bass
Casey Jones – drums
Terry Ogolini - tenor saxophone
Steve Eisen - baritone saxophone
Don Tenuto - trumpet
Jim Exum - trombone
Gene Barge – tenor saxophone on "Lights Out"
Billy Branch – harmonica on "Iodine in My Coffee"
Production
Johnny Winter, Bruce Iglauer, Dick Shurman – producers
Fred Breitberg – recording engineer
Glenn Odagawa – assistant recording engineer

References

1984 albums
Johnny Winter albums
Albums produced by Bruce Iglauer
Albums produced by Johnny Winter
Alligator Records albums